Marcelline Aboh (1940 – 20 August 2017), known by her alias Détin Bonsoir, was a Beninese filmmaker and actress from Porto-Novo. She died of a heart attack after suffering health problems due to her age.

She was the main comedian of the women-folk comedy group Les échos de la capitale. She first joined them in 1980 after beginning her theatre career in 1958.

She had eight children.

Sources 

1940 births
2017 deaths
People from Porto-Novo
20th-century Beninese actresses
Women comedians
Beninese film actresses